Euchlaena amoenaria, the deep yellow euchlaena, is a moth of the  family Geometridae. It is found in eastern North America.

The wingspan is 30–50 mm. Adults are on wing from May to September. There are two generations per year.

The larval food plant is unknown, but larvae of other species in the genus feed on the foliage of deciduous trees.

External links
Bug Guide
Images

Angeronini